Kinthali is a village in Srikakulam district of the Indian state of Andhra Pradesh. It is located in Ponduru mandal (a.k.a. tehsil or administrative division) of Srikakulam revenue division.

References

Villages in Srikakulam district